Hannes Kärkkäinen (17 July 1902 – 21 April 1938) was a Finnish diver who competed in the men's 10 metre platform event at the 1924 Summer Olympics.

References

External links
 

1902 births
1938 deaths
Finnish male divers
Olympic divers of Finland
Divers at the 1924 Summer Olympics
People from Lappeenranta
Great Purge victims from Finland
Sportspeople from South Karelia